Pristella ariporo is a freshwater fish in the family Characidae of the order Characiformes. It is a tropical fish. It resides in the basin of the Orinoco in Colombia.

References

Fish described in 2019
Freshwater fish of South America
Characidae